Jean de Mas Latrie (23 November 1879 – 5 September 1914) was a French fencer and modern pentathlete. He competed in the individual sabre event at the 1908 Summer Olympics and the modern pentathlon at the 1912 Summer Olympics. He was killed in action during World War I.

See also
 List of Olympians killed in World War I

References

External links
 

1879 births
1914 deaths
French male sabre fencers
French male modern pentathletes
Olympic fencers of France
Olympic modern pentathletes of France
Fencers at the 1908 Summer Olympics
Modern pentathletes at the 1912 Summer Olympics
Sportspeople from Paris
French military personnel killed in World War I